Dave Crooks is a former member of the Indiana House of Representatives, where he represented the 63rd District from 1996 to 2008. He is currently seeking the Democratic nomination for US Congress in Indiana's 8th Congressional District.

Early life, education, and business career
Crooks was born and raised in Sullivan County, Indiana. He grew up in a working-class household, where his brother was a mine worker, his mother and sister were steel workers, and his father was a machinist. Crooks entered the work force at the age of nine at a gas station down the street from his family's home. He began working at his first radio station at 17 and eventually came to own stations in both Daviess and Knox counties.

Indiana House of Representatives

Elections
Crooks was first elected to the 63rd House District in the Indiana House of Representatives in 1996.  In 2002, he won re-election unopposed. In 2004, he won re-election with 51% of the vote. In 2006, he won re-election with 62% of the vote. In 2008, Crooks choose not to seek re-election and was replaced by current Rep. Mark Messmer (R) who defeated his Democratic opponent with 57% of the vote.

Committee assignments
During his time in the general assembly, Crooks served as Chairman of the Commerce and Utilities Committee and as Chairman of the Insurance and Small Business Committee.  He was appointed to the position of Assistant Minority Whip.

2012 congressional election

In May 2011 Dave Crooks announced his candidacy to represent Indiana's 8th Congressional District in the United States Congress. He will face Republican incumbent Larry Bucshon in the general election.

On December 10, 2011, Crooks was endorsed by the 8th District Democratic Central Committee. Crooks and his primary opponent, Patrick Scates, had agreed before the caucus that whoever lost the endorsement would drop out of the race and endorse the winner.

The vote results were Crooks, Dave (Democratic) 
122325   
Gadau, Bart (Libertarian) 
10134   
Bucshon, Larry D. (Republican) 
151533

Personal life
Crooks lives with his wife Shelley in Brazil, Indiana. They have three children.

References

External links
Dave Crooks for U.S. Congress official campaign website
Indiana State Legislature - Representative Dave Crooks official government website (archive)
 
Campaign contributions at OpenSecrets.org

Democratic Party members of the Indiana House of Representatives
1963 births
Living people
People from Sullivan, Indiana